The 2011 Copa do Brasil (officially known as the 2011 Copa Kia do Brasil for sponsorship reasons) was the 23rd edition of the Copa do Brasil, Brazil's national football cup tournament. It began on February 16 and ended on June 8. This edition's champion was Vasco da Gama, with Coritiba ending as runners-up.

Format
The competition is a single elimination knockout tournament featuring two-legged ties. In the first two rounds, if the away team wins the first match by 2 or more goals, the winner advances to the next round and the second leg will not be played. The away goals rule will be used. The winner qualifies to the 2012 Copa Libertadores.

Qualified teams
Sixty-four teams qualified to the 2011 Copa do Brasil either through their states championship or through a ranking of teams.

Qualified by state championships and other competitions
Fifty-four teams qualified via their respective state competitions. Depending on their status with the Brazilian Football Confederation, each of the 27 state federations sent anywhere from one to three clubs. Each state determined their own qualification criteria, but they usually sent the clubs with best records in the state championships or other special competitions.

Qualified by CBF club ranking
Ten clubs qualified as one of the top ten clubs in CBF's club ranking, excluding those qualified by state competitions and clubs playing in the 2011 Copa Libertadores.

Bracket
Teams that play in their home stadium in the first leg are marked with †.

First phase
The First Phase began on February 16 and ended on March 3.

Group 1

Flamengo advanced because they won by at least two goals as the visiting team in the first game.

Group 2

Tied on points 3–3, Fortaleza advanced on greater goal difference.

Group 3

Tied on points 2–2 and equal on goal difference, Guarani advanced on away goals.

Group 4

ASA advanced on points 4–1.

Group 5

Atlético Mineiro advanced on points 6–0.

Group 6

Tied on points 3–3, Grêmio Prudente advanced on greater goal difference.

Group 7

Ceará advanced because they won by at least two goals as the visiting team in the first game.

Group 8

Brasiliense advanced on points 4–1.

Group 9

Botafogo (PB) advanced on points 4–1.

Group 10

Caxias advanced because they won by at least two goals as the visiting team in the first game.

Group 11

Coritiba advanced on points 6–0.

Group 12

Tied on points 3–3 and tied on goal difference, Atlético Goianiense advanced on away goals.

Group 13

Palmeiras advanced on points 6–0.

Group 14

Uberaba advanced because they won by at least two goals as the visiting team in the first game.

Group 15

Tied on points 2–2 and tied on goal difference, Sampaio Corrêa advanced on away goals.

Group 16

Santo André advanced on points 6–0.

Group 17

Vasco da Gama advanced because they won by at least two goals as the visiting team in the first game.

Group 18

ABC advanced on points 4–1.

Group 19

Tied on points 3–3, Bangu advanced on greater goal difference.

Group 20

Tied on points 3–3, Náutico advanced on greater goal difference.

Group 21

Tied on points 3–3, Atlético Paranaense advanced on goal difference.

Group 22

Tied on points 3–3, Paulista advanced on greater goal difference.

Group 23

Bahia advanced on points 4–1.

Group 24

Paysandu advance on points 4–1.

Group 25

Tied 1–1 on points and equal on goal difference, Botafogo advanced on penalties 4–1.

Group 26

Paraná advanced on points 4–1.

Group 27

Avai advanced because they won by at least two goals as the visiting team in the first game.

Group 28

Ipatinga advanced on points 6–0.

Group 29

São Paulo advanced because they won by at least two goals as the visiting team in the first game.

Group 30

Santa Cruz advanced because they won by at least two goals as the visiting team in the first game.

Group 31

Goiás advanced because they won by at least two goals as the visiting team in the first game.

Group 32

Ponte Preta advanced because Baré was eliminated from the competitions by the STJD.

Second phase
The Second Phase began on March 16 and ended on April 6.

Group 33 

Flamengo advanced because they won by at least two goals as the visiting team in the first game.

Group 34 

Tied on points 2–2, Horizonte advanced on away goals.

Group 35 

Grêmio Prudente advanced on points 4–1.

Group 36 

Ceará advanced on points 4–1.

Group 37 

Caxias advanced on points 6–0.

Group 38 

Coritiba advance on points 6–0.

Group 39 

Palmeiras advanced because they won by at least two goals as the visiting team in the first game.

Group 40 

Tied on points 3–3, Santo André advanced on away goals.

Group 41 

Vasco da Gama advanced on points 4–1.

Group 42 

Náutico advanced because they won by at least two goals as the visiting team in the first game.

Group 43 

Atlético Paranaense advanced because they won by at least two goals as the visiting team in the first game.

Group 44 

Bahia advance on points 4–1.

Group 45 

Botafogo advanced on points 6–0.

Group 46

Group 47 

Tied on points, São Paulo advanced on better goal difference.

Group 48 

Goiás advanced because they won by at least two goals as the visiting team in the first game.

Round of 16
The Round of 16 began on April 13 and ended on April 27.

Group 49

Flamengo advanced on points 4–1.

Group 50

Ceará advanced on points 6–0.

Group 51

Coritiba advanced on points 6–0.

Group 52

Palmeiras advanced on points 6–0.

Group 53

Vasco da Gama advanced on points 4–1.

Group 54

Atlético Paranaense advanced on points 4–1.

Group 55

Tied 2–2 on points, Avaí advanced on away goals.

Group 56

São Paulo advanced on points 6–0.

Quarterfinals
The Quarterfinals began on May 4 and ended on May 12.

Group 57

Ceará advanced on points 4–1.

Group 58

Tied on points 3–3, Coritiba advanced on better goal difference.

Group 59

Tied on points 2–2, Vasco da Gama advanced on away goals.

Group 60

Tied on points 3–3, Avaí advanced on better goal difference.

Semifinals
The Semifinals began on May 18 and ended on May 25.

Group 61

Coritiba advanced on points 4–1.

Group 62

Vasco da Gama advanced on points 4–1.

Finals

The Finals was played on June 1 and June 8.

Group 63

Tied on points 3–3, Vasco da Gama won on away goals.

Top goalscorers

References

External links
Official website 
Official webpage at the CBF's official website 

2011 domestic association football cups
2011
2011 Brazilian football competitions